Robert Duval (born October 9, 1946) is an American professional golfer and is best known for being the father of David Duval, formerly the top-ranked player in the world.

Early years
Duval was born in Schenectady, New York, the son of professional golfer Henry '"Hap" Duval, and grew up in upstate New York. His father worked full-time for the United States Post Office Department starting at 4 a.m., then taught or played golf until dark, weather permitting. In order to be around his father, Bob learned to play golf when he was six, but the game was also a fit with his competitive nature. He attended Florida State University on a golf scholarship, but Hubert Green was the star of the college team.

Club pro
Duval did not consider playing on the pro tour; he married his first wife, Diane Poole, and was hired at Timuquana Country Club in Jacksonville, Florida as an assistant pro in 1968. The following year, he switched to the municipal course in Fernandina Beach for four years. His son Brent was born in 1969, followed by David in 1971 and Deirdre in 1976. Duval returned to Timuquana as head pro in 1973, and stayed there for 13 years while raising his children.

Tragedy
Duval's oldest son, Brent, developed aplastic anemia. The family sought treatment at Rainbow Babies & Children's Hospital in Cleveland, Ohio, where younger brother David, who was 9, underwent surgery to donate bone marrow. Unfortunately, the transplant was not successful, and Brent died as a result of sepsis on May 17, 1981 at age 12. Both Bob and Diane used alcohol to numb the emotional pain and their relationship deteriorated. Duval was unable to cope, and moved out of the family home for a year. Counseling enabled him to reunite with his wife and children, and in 1987, he accepted an offer to be golf pro at the Plantation, a new gated, golf community in Ponte Vedra Beach, Florida. Duval's father, "Hap" died in 1991, and Bob was unhappy in his marriage, so in 1993, he left his family permanently and the divorce was final in 1996. When Duval began seeing Sharon Blum, David stood by his mother, who was deeply depressed. He blamed his father and their relationship diminished. After some time had passed, they began talking again, and David realized that his father was happy.

Senior golf
As his 50th birthday approached, David encouraged him to join the Senior PGA Tour (now known as the Champions Tour). Bob stated, "When he told me that he believed in my game, especially after what we had been through, it did a lot for my confidence."  
Duval played in some "club pro" tournaments to sharpen his game. He and Shari were together constantly, and got married in 1996. Jack Nicklaus put together a series of 14 south Florida tournaments called the Golden Bear Tour. The entry fee was $15,000 plus living expenses, and Duval didn't have the money. Shari created a business proposal for individuals to sponsor Bob Duval's tour career. Six friends invested $5,000 each, which would be reimbursed from winnings. Duval won one of the tournaments and was certain he could make it on the tour. His total winnings were $29,000, allowing him to repay the sponsors.

He has about two dozen top-10 finishes including a wire-to-wire win at the 1999 Emerald Coast Classic which he shared with his new wife, Shari. His win came on the same day that his son David won The Players Championship on the PGA Tour and ascended to the #1 ranking in the world.

Author
In June 2001, Duval began working with Massachusetts-based author Carl Vigeland on a book that became part of a Basic Books series, the Art of Mentoring. Told in the form of letters to members of Duval's family and his many friends, the book focuses on the connections between a person's life and his or her golf game. The letters also trace his life and career, with the final, moving letter addressed to the ghost of his father, Hap, also a golf professional. An Afterword follows under David Duval's byline. Letters to a Young Golfer, published to critical acclaim in 2002, is still in print.

Professional wins (1)

Senior PGA Tour wins (1)

Senior PGA Tour playoff record (0–1)

See also
List of Florida State Seminoles men's golfers

References

External links

American male golfers
Florida State Seminoles men's golfers
PGA Tour Champions golfers
Golfers from New York (state)
Golfers from Florida
Sportspeople from Schenectady, New York
People from Ponte Vedra Beach, Florida
1946 births
Living people